The Gomalina River is a river in the state of Mato Grosso, Brazil.

Course

The Gomalina River rises in the  Serra de Santa Bárbara State Park, created in 1997.
It flows in a generally northwest direction until it meets the Barbado River.

See also
List of rivers of Mato Grosso

References

Sources

Rivers of Mato Grosso